Carl Peter Burnitz (14 January 1824, Frankfurt - 18 August 1886, Frankfurt) was a German landscape painter who began as a lawyer.

Life and work 
He became an orphan at the age of nine and was placed under the care of his uncle, the architect Rudolf Burnitz. After graduating from the local schools, he entered the University of Berlin, where he studied law. In 1844, he moved to the University of Göttingen, then to the University of Heidelberg where he received his Doktor Juris (Doctor of Law) degree in 1847.

That summer, he began an extensive tour of Rome, Naples and Palermo. He returned to Frankfurt in 1849, briefly practicing law but, feeling dissatisfied with the legal profession and inspired by what he had seen in Italy, he took another trip in 1852, visiting Algiers and Madrid. There he met the painter Fritz Bamberger who suggested that Burnitz go to Paris to study art. With Bamberger's recommendation, he made contact with the lithographer Karl Bodmer, who introduced him to the Barbizon School. He soon began studying with Emile Lambinet.

In 1857, he returned to Frankfurt where he made friends with Anton Burger and Jakob Fürchtegott Dielmann, who convinced him to live at the art colony in Kronberg. By 1878, he was successful enough to purchase a large, multi-story home in Frankfurt. However, following a common custom among the newly-rich, he never lived there himself. Instead, it became the residence of fellow artist Eduard von Steinle.

Most of his paintings are in private collections, as is the case with a majority of the artists who worked at Kronberg.

References

Further reading 
 
 F. Fried: Peter Burnitz, ein Frankfurter Meister. In: Frankfurter Zeitung. Nr. 276 of 6 October 1900.
 Leopold Levis: Peter Burnitz. Ein Beitrag zur Geschichte der Malerei des neunzehnten Jahrhunderts in Frankfurt am Main. Dissertation, Johann Wolfgang Goethe University, Frankfurt (1937)

External links 

 Carl Burnitz @ Kronberger Maler
 ArtNet: Five pages of paintings by Burnitz

1824 births
1886 deaths
Landscape painters
Burials at Frankfurt Main Cemetery
19th-century German painters
19th-century German male artists
German male painters